The 2020 Sentinel Storage Alberta Scotties Tournament of Hearts, the provincial women's curling championship for Alberta, was held January 22–26 at The Murray Arena in Okotoks, Alberta. The winning Laura Walker rink represented Alberta at the 2020 Scotties Tournament of Hearts in Moose Jaw, Saskatchewan and finished with a 3–4 record.

Laura Walker won her first Alberta Scotties Tournament of Hearts and capped of an undefeated tournament by defeating Kelsey Rocque's rink 7–4 in the final. Rocque made the final in 2019 as well, falling to eventual Canadian champion Chelsea Carey.

Qualification process

Teams
The teams are listed as follows:

Notes
  Susan O'Connor is sparing for Team Scheidegger's second Jessie Haughian as she is on maternity leave.

Round-robin standings
Final round-robin standings

Round-robin results
All draw times are listed in Mountain Time (UTC-07:00).

Draw 1
Wednesday, January 22, 11:00 am

Draw 2
Wednesday, January 22, 6:30 pm

Draw 3
Thursday, January 23, 1:00 pm

Draw 4
Thursday, January 23, 6:30 pm

Draw 5
Friday, January 24, 1:00 pm

Draw 6
Friday, January 24, 6:30 pm

Draw 7
Saturday, January 25, 8:30 am

Playoffs

1 vs. 2
Saturday, January 25, 6:30 pm

3 vs. 4
Saturday, January 25, 2:00 pm

Semifinal
Sunday, January 26, 10:00 am

Final
Sunday, January 26, 5:00 pm

Qualification

Qualifier #1
December 20–22, Calgary Curling Club, Calgary

Qualifier #2
January 10–12, Jasper Place Curling Club, Edmonton

References

External links

2020 in Alberta
Curling in Alberta
2020 Scotties Tournament of Hearts
January 2020 sports events in Canada
Okotoks